Shri Atmanand Jain Institute of Management and Technology (AIMT), in Ambala was established in 1996 to provide modern Quality Management Education to students. AIMT is affiliated to Kurukshetra University, and is approved by the All India Council for Technical Education (AICTE), New Delhi. Since inception, the institute has been an active member of the Confederation of Indian Industry (CII), Ludhiana Management Association (LMA) and All India Management Association (AIMA).

The institute is run by the Management of Shri Atmanand Jain College Trust & Management Society, established in 1938, under the Society Registration Act XXI of 1860, as very profitable educational society. The society also runs Shri Atmanand Jain (PG) College, Ambala City, which is affiliated to Kurukshetra University, Kurukshetra for B.A., B.Sc., B.Com., B.B.A., M.A. (Eco.), M.Com., PGDCA, M.Sc. (Software) and is also running evening classes of B.Com. and M.Com.

The institute is providing full-time Master of Computer Application (MCA) and Master of Business Administration (MBA) courses.

References

External links
 http://www.aimtambala.com

Jain universities and colleges
Universities and colleges in Haryana
Ambala
Business schools in Haryana
Kurukshetra University